Dejan Kovačević (born December 27, 1996) is a Bosnian-German professional basketball player who last played for Crailsheim Merlins of the Basketball Bundesliga (BBL). He previously played for Bayern Munich.

Following the 2016–17 campaign, Kovačević signed with s.Oliver Würzburg of the German Basketball Bundesliga.

References 

1996 births
Living people
Centers (basketball)
Crailsheim Merlins players
FC Bayern Munich basketball players
German men's basketball players
German people of Slavic descent
Power forwards (basketball)
s.Oliver Würzburg players